The Man and the Monster (Spanish:  El hombre y el monstruo) is a 1958 Mexican horror film, directed by Rafael Baledón.

Plot summary 
The film is about a pianist who sells his soul to the Devil in order to become the greatest pianist over the world. But, every time a particular piece of music is played by him -Piano Concerto No. 1 (Tchaikovsky)- , he transforms into a murderous monster.

Reception 
According to the website Classic-Horror:
"Intelligently dubbed (it looks like they hired a translator AND a screenwriter), marvelously acted, and nicely directed, there's not a lot The Man and the Monster isn't, except, perhaps, expensive."

References

External links
 
 

1958 horror films
1958 films
Mexican black-and-white films
1950s Spanish-language films
Deal with the Devil
1950s Mexican films